The Supreme Court of the United States handed down one per curiam opinion during its 2022 term, which began October 3, 2022 and will conclude October 1, 2023.

Because per curiam decisions are issued from the Court as an institution, these opinions all lack the attribution of authorship or joining votes to specific justices. All justices on the Court at the time the decision was handed down are assumed to have participated and concurred unless otherwise noted.

Court membership

Chief Justice: John Roberts

Associate Justices: Clarence Thomas, Samuel Alito, Sonia Sotomayor, Elena Kagan, Neil Gorsuch, Brett Kavanaugh, Amy Coney Barrett, Ketanji Brown Jackson.

See also 
 List of United States Supreme Court cases, volume 598

Notes

References

 

United States Supreme Court per curiam opinions
Lists of 2022 term United States Supreme Court opinions
2022 per curiam